Fortified Zone, known in Japan as  is a 1991 video game developed and published by Jaleco for the Game Boy.  It was first released in Japan on February 26, 1991 and later released in North America in September 1991.  It was later added to the Nintendo 3DS's Virtual Console on July 7, 2011, but the Australia region had it added on July 28, 2011.

Story
Fortified Zone's plot follows two Mercenaries named Masato Kanzaki and Mizuki Makimura as they infiltrate a literal fortified zone, where they must take on mercenaries, soldiers, robots and monsters before destroying the central complex at the fortified zone's heart.

Gameplay
Fortified Zone allows the player to switch between two characters during game play. Each character has their own strengths and weaknesses: Masato (the male mercenary) uses all the special weapons, but cannot jump. Mizuki (the female mercenary) can jump, but cannot use the special weapons. A top-down shoot-'em-up, the game had four multi-room levels, titled 'Field', 'Jungle', 'Caves' and 'Complex'. At the end of each level the player faces a 'boss' character: a cannon installation, a supertank, a dragon, a bulldozer and a large assault vehicle as the final boss. Items that can be picked up in gameplay include medical packs, flamethrowers, hand grenades, rocket launchers, 3-way machine guns and chain guns.

Sequels
The game was the first entry in the Ikari no Yōsai series, and was followed by two sequels: Ikari no Yōsai 2 for the Game Boy (which was released only in Japan), and Ikari no Yōsai for the Super Famicom (released outside Japan as Operation Logic Bomb for the Super NES). The former was later re-released for the Japanese 3DS Virtual Console on January 11, 2012.

Reception

Super Gamer gave an overall score of 70% stating: "Original shoot-'em-up which is a bit too short to hold anybody in its grasp for long."

In Pop Culture
Survival of the Fastest, the debut album of Irish thrash metal band Gama Bomb features the song 'Fortified Zone' based on the game.

References

External links
Ikari no Yōsai and Ikari no Yōsai 2 at Jaleco 

1991 video games
Action video games
Jaleco games
City Connection franchises
Cooperative video games
Run and gun games
Game Boy games
Video games developed in Japan
Video games scored by Tsukasa Tawada
Virtual Console games
Virtual Console games for Nintendo 3DS
Multiplayer and single-player video games